State elections were held in South Australia on 6 April 1918. All 46 seats in the South Australian House of Assembly were up for election. The incumbent Liberal Union government led by Premier of South Australia Archibald Peake defeated the opposition Australian Labor Party led by Leader of the Opposition Andrew Kirkpatrick. Each district elected multiple members, with voters casting multiple votes.

The 1918 election was the first at which any women stood as candidates. Selina Siggins (Adelaide) and Jeanne Young (Sturt) both ran unsuccessfully as independents.

Background
The Crawford Vaughan Labor government fell in July 1917 due to the Australian Labor Party split of 1916 on conscription, and was replaced by a Peake Liberal minority government. This was replaced by the Peake Liberal-National Labor coalition government in August 1917. Peake initially formed a ministry of liberals, but after complaints from National Labor who had supported him in the confidence motion, he included three National Labor members. Crawford Vaughan, National Labor leader, did not take a place in the ministry. The Liberal and National Labor parties went to the election in coalition.

The first new parties emerged since the two-party system was introduced from the 1910 state election − the Farmers and Settlers Association (F&S), Single Tax (ST) and the Farmers and Producers Country Party (FPCP). The United Labor Party was renamed to the South Australian Branch of the Australian Labor Party on 14 September 1917.

Results

|}

See also
Results of the 1918 South Australian state election (House of Assembly)
Candidates of the South Australian state election, 1918
Members of the South Australian House of Assembly, 1918-1921
Members of the South Australian Legislative Council, 1918-1921

Notes

References
History of South Australian elections 1857-2006, volume 1: ECSA
State and federal election results in Australia since 1890

Elections in South Australia
1918 elections in Australia
1910s in South Australia
April 1918 events